The Royal Cornwall Polytechnic Society (commonly known as The Poly) is an educational, cultural and scientific charity, as well as a local arts and cinema venue, based in Falmouth, Cornwall, England, United Kingdom. The Society exists to promote innovation in the arts and sciences.

History 

In 1832 the Fox family.
a prominent Quaker business family of Falmouth, founded the Cornwall Polytechnic Society, to promote the ideas and inventions of the workers in their Perran Foundry. This was the first use of the word ‘Polytechnic’ (meaning "of many arts and techniques") in Britain.

In 1835 King William IV bestowed Royal Patronage on the Society, at the request of Davies Gilbert and it changed its name from the Cornwall Polytechnic Society to the Royal Cornwall Polytechnic Society.

In the same year the Polytechnic Hall was built, at 24 Church Street, Falmouth, being originally used for “objects connected with the sciences, arts and literature”, but not for theatrical purposes. This restriction was removed in 1889 to permit “dramatic plays”. The building was designed by George Wightwick.

By 1837, the Society had local Committees in Falmouth & Penryn, Truro, Redruth, Camborne, St. Day & Chacewater, Helston, Penzance & Marazion, Hayle, St. Austell & Fowey, Liskeard and Bodmin, as well as a Ladies Committee. In all, there were 98 committee members.

The Society played a prominent role in industrial development in the 19th century, being instrumental in the development of the “Man engine” in mines also improved drilling machinery, mine ventilation, the health and welfare of fishermen and miners – and explosives. At the 1865 Exhibition a first Silver Medal was awarded for Nobel’s nitro-glycerine, following a demonstration at Falmouth docks in which a wrought iron anvil of about three hundredweight was blown up by a small quantity, and a larger quantity scattered from forty to fifty tons of rock.  Prentice's gun cotton was also demonstrated.
In 1858 the Society founded The Miners Association to better aid the mining industry.

The first Secretary to the Poly was Thomas Brown Jordan, followed by William Westcott Rundell.

In 1840, Jordan was succeeded as Secretary by Robert Hunt, who both organised the programme of Exhibitions and Lectures and gave fascinating lectures himself.	
The Society benefitted from the availability of "star" scientific and technical speakers in its Lecture Programmes, thanks to the network of friends of Robert Were Fox, F.R.S. and his brother Charles Fox. The presentation of the cutting edge of scientific knowledge resulted in large and enthusiastic audiences.

The Society has had many notable presidents including the novelist Howard Spring who lived in Falmouth from 1947 to 1965 and served for eight years.

Notable people 

Notable members and others associated with the Poly include:
 Jonathan Couch (1789–1870), physician and naturalist
 Thomas Brown Jordan (1807–1890), engineer
 Charles Lemon (1784–1868), FRS, MP, Chair of the Poly
 Henry Letheby (1816–1876), analytical chemist and public health engineer
 Matthew Paul Moyle (1788–1880), surgeon and geologist
 John Eastman Palmer, 19th-century photographer
 John Arthur Phillips (1822–1887), mining engineer and metallurgist
 William Westcott Rundell (1816–1897) Secretary of the Society from 1845–55
 Walter Hawken Tregellas (1831–1894), writer
 Elizabeth Andrew Warren (1786–1864), botanist

21st-century developments 
There is no serious overview of developments in the Poly from its 19th-century heyday. Peter Gilson, the Society's historian until his death in 2009, prepared a basic chronology (Note 11), which is listed below. An initial judgement would be that the Society lost its scientific impetus sometime in latter decades of the 19th century, presumably reflecting the relative decline of Cornwall's economy which, in turn, was driven by relentless decline of the mining industry from the 1850s. The Society was left with a substantial building, which could be used for films and, from the mid-Century, theatrical productions. Members kept up programmes of exhibitions and lectures, but there were regular financial problems caused by the need to maintain an ageing building. During the 1950s, the author Howard Spring seems to have injected a new burst of life into the Society, and the development of Falmouth Art School (now, Falmouth University) meant that it was able to serve a thriving local artistic community. There were, however, growing tensions between the Artistic and more scholarly sides of the Society, which came to one particularly critical phase in 2006–10 when an ambitious attempt to develop a major commercially-driven artistic programme failed and brought the Society close to bankruptcy. A Community-led campaign to "Save Our Poly" produced a revitalisation of the Society, which now (2012) supports a varied programme of Films, Plays, Comedy, Talks, Artistic exhibitions and Local History. The Society is also the owner of the biggest collection of pictures of Henry Scott Tuke (over 200 paintings and drawings). In 2012, the Society is benefitting from the relative health of the local Falmouth economy, and from the emergence of the nearby Tremough campus of the Combined Universities of Cornwall. This means that the Poly's facilities in the heart of Falmouth are increasingly a major asset to both Town and Gown.

As far as one can tell, the Poly was not only the first Polytechnic in the English-speaking world, but has now become the last one (at least in the UK). This is a proud history.

1902 – Exhibition theme was "Electricity"
1907 – Biennial "Meeting" to the held in the summer
1909 – 71st Exhibition held in Camborne – the first time out of Falmouth
1910 – Exhibition at Truro, with them of "Agriculture and Horticulture". The Hall was renovated, with renewed gallery seating and improved exits.
1911 – Licence granted for "Cinematograph Shows", and the Hall was hired to Harris Brothers for this purpose – an arrangement which continued until 1931
1914–18 – The Society's normal programme was disrupted as the building was used by HM Forces at various times as a canteen, dance- and concert-hall and hospital
1915–18 – Tin and Tungsten Research Board formed as a result of war requirements. Summer meetings continued.
1920 – 74th Exhibition at Camborne. Sir Edward Nicholl Prizes inaugurated.
1922 – Art schools participate in Exhibition. "Scenes of old Falmouth" presented by the Women's Institute at Rosehill.
1925 – Exhibition of Essays, Models, Art and Craftwork/Photography by children.
1928 – W.Tregoning Hooper took over Observatory work.
1930 – Exhibition at Penzance: Mining and British Ropes entries.
1931 – Gallery completely renovated when Museum transferred from Municipal Buildings.
1933 – Centenary Meeting lasted 6days with an Exhibition, Lectures and Visits.
1934-8 – Regular programmes of winter lectures, summer meetings and Exhibitions
1939 – Lectures discontinued on the outbreak of war
1940–41 – Activities severely curtailed as a result of air raids
1942 – Hall used as a canteen and dance hall for HM Forces
1943 – Society purchased 16 & 17 Porhan Street
1944 – Threat of requisition og building by the Navy
1945 – Problems over letting the Hall. Renovation badly needed
1946 – Partial renovation: Model Exhibition and Winter lectures
1947 – Howard Spring joined the Society
1949 – The building was in a dangerous condition
1951 – Renovation of the building completed, but Society in grave financial position
1952 – Schools' Art Exhibition: benefit performance of Howard Spring's "Gentle Assassin"
1953 – Howard Spring elected president. Observatory closed and sold. Museum dispersed.
1954 – Falmouth Arts Centre created. Polytechnic Arts Committee formed.
1955 – Stage and Gallery lighting improved
1958 – South West Arts Conference held. Building slightly damaged by fire
1961 – Gallery "filled in". Arts Theatre created.
1964 – Performance of "Morvoren", an opera by Philip Cannon and Maisie Radford
1965 – Porhan Street demolished in road widening. Rear Entrance improved.
1966–67 – Total reconstruction of theatre with tiered seating ... cost, £6,000
1968 – Workshop/Studio built in New Street
1969 – Tuke Collection presented to the Society by Mr Brain Price.
1976 – Theatre Workshop formed
1979 – Toynbee Bequest received
1980 – "Falmouth Arts Project" defeated at AGM
1981 – South West Arts grant lost
1982 – Library redecorated and reorganised
1983 – 150th anniversary celebrated with plaque in entrance hall. Foundation lectures delivered.
1985 – "Falmouth Research Project" set up: Exhibition "Falmouth 1835 – 1865"
1987 – "Poly Craft Group" formed
1994 – Paul Smales lectures started
1999 – Visit of Princess Anne to maritime exhibition
2000 – the Society merged with Falmouth Arts, being renamed the Falmouth Arts Centre. New projection room and film/sound equipment: Legacies from Mavis Saunders and Jet Steele. Steele Gallery named
2003 – Sale of Boulton/Watts papers for £500,000
2004 – New seating in theatre and new logo: Purchase of Barnicoat building
2005 – New Constitution/Memorandum of Association
2006 – Members agreed to create a trading wing
2008 – Tuke Collection restored – £100,000 raised from grants and gifts. Chasing Clouds Exhibition top celebrate the 175th anniversary.
2010 – In January 2010, the trading company which ran the Poly cinema programme went into administration. A "Save our Poly" campaign led to the creation of a totally new Board.
2011 – The Board decided to adopt "The Poly" as its working name, keeping "Royal Cornwall Polytechnic Society" purely for legal needs.
2012 – Sale of Maritime Collection completed
2015 – New Digital cinema system installed to enable the showing of recent film releases

Notes and references

Notes

Bibliography
 The Journals of Caroline Fox, 1835–1871: a selection, ed. Wendy Monk; London, Paul Elek, (1972) 
 Barclay Fox's journal; edited by Raymond L. Brett; London : Bell and Hyman, 1979  and Totowa, N.J. : Rowman & Littlefield 
 Historical Synopsis of the Royal Cornwall Polytechnic Society ... presented ... to the Society on its year of Jubilee, 1882. (List of essays, treatises and scientific papers published in the Reports.) by Wilson Lloyd Fox; 76 pages. 1882.  In : Falmouth.-Royal Cornwall Polytechnic Society, Report, etc. (Fiftieth and Jubilee Report, 1882.) [1833, etc.] 8º.   British Library System number 001282900
J.A. Buckley The Cornish Mining Industry: a brief history; Redruth, Tor Mark, 2nd Edn. 2002  For “Man Engine” see pages 26 to 29.
 Peter Gilson "Chronology of the Royal Cornwall Polytechnic Society Founded 1833" – unpublished manuscript, written in 1987 (?) held by The Poly's Local History Group.

Oxford Dictionary of National Biography entries, relating to the Poly 

 Rosamund  Reid, ‘Wightwick, George (1802–1872)’, Oxford Dictionary of National Biography, Oxford University Press, 2004 accessed 19 June 2006
 Alan Pearson, 'Hunt, Robert (1807–1887)’, Oxford Dictionary of National Biography, Oxford University Press, 2004 accessed 21 June 2006
 David Philip Miller, 'Gilbert [Giddy], Davies (1767–1839)’, Oxford Dictionary of National Biography, Oxford University Press, 2004 accessed 21 June 2006
 G. C. Boase, 'Fox, Charles (1797–1878)’, rev. Justin Brooke, Oxford Dictionary of National Biography, Oxford University Press, 2004 accessed 13 June 2006
 Denise Crook, 'Fox, Robert Were (1789–1877)’, Oxford Dictionary of National Biography, Oxford University Press, 2004 accessed 13 June 2006

Further reading 

 Alan Pearson. "A study of the Royal Cornwall Polytechnic Society": Thesis submitted for a M.A Degree to the University of Exeter, September 1973. This work and a long run of the annual Reports of the Poly are held in the Local History Reference Section of Falmouth Library.
Annual report of the RCPS for 1858 available on Googlebooks

External links 
 The Poly website
 The Poly Local History Group's site of historic images
 RCPS Annual Report for 1861, on Google Books
 Annual report of the RCPS for 1858 available on Googlebooks

Education in Cornwall
History of Cornwall
Clubs and societies in Cornwall
Cornish mining organisations
Falmouth, Cornwall
1832 establishments in England
Regional and local learned societies of the United Kingdom
Organizations established in 1832
Organisations based in Cornwall with royal patronage
Buildings and structures in Falmouth, Cornwall
Charities based in England